RingCube vDesk is a Desktop virtualization product from RingCube Technologies. vDesk is a client virtualization or virtual workspace platform which virtualizes the entire desktop at an operating system level. The platform can be deployed in four different modes: on a local PC, on an external USB device, streamed across a network, or in conjunction with existing VDI solutions.

See also 
 Desktop virtualization
 MojoPac - Similar product also by RingCube Technologies
 Portable application creators
 Windows To Go

References

External links 
 Official site

Virtualization software